Shahid Avini Metro Station is a station on Shiraz Metro Line 1. The station opened on 7 August 2016. It is located on Khabarneger Street at the Junction with Avini Boulevard between Namazi Metro Station and Shahid Motahhari Metro Station. It is most commonly used by the students and faculty of the Shahid Dastgheib 1 Secondary School which is adjacent to the metro's ground-level entrance.

Shiraz Metro stations
Railway stations opened in 2016